John Ainsworth (by 1523 – 1558 or 1559), of Pershore and Worcester, was an English politician.

Biography
Educated in Cambridge by 1522, obtained BA degree in 1526/1527. He held the offices of Member of the Twenty-Four, Worcester in 1544, auditor in 1547–1548, 1553–1554, chamberlain 1548–1549. Ainsworth may have promoted the Act setting aside a seven-year apprenticeship for clothiers in Worcester and other towns.

Ainsworth was a Member of Parliament for Worcester in April 1554.

References

Year of birth missing
1558 deaths
1559 deaths
People from Pershore
Members of the Parliament of England for Worcester
English MPs 1554